SimCorp is a Danish company providing software and services to financial institutions such as asset managers, banks, national banks, pension funds, sovereign wealth funds and insurance companies worldwide.

Their core product is the SimCorp Dimension, a front to back integrated investment management system used by more than 190 clients around the world.

SimCorp was founded in 1971 and has its headquarters in Copenhagen and has offices in over 20 locations throughout Europe, Asia, and North America. SimCorp has over 1800 employees.

Over the years, SimCorp has acquired several companies:

 Equipos, now SimCorp Coric, was acquired in 2014 and offers client reporting software
 APL Italiana, now SimCorp Italiana, was acquired in 2017 and provides integrated investment management software for the Italian insurance market
 AIM Software, now SimCorp Gain, was acquired in 2019 and focuses on enterprise data management software for the buy-side

The company is listed on the Nasdaq Copenhagen exchange.

References 

Companies listed on the Nasdaq 
Software companies based in Copenhagen
1971 establishments in Denmark
Companies based in Copenhagen Municipality